This is a list of battalions of the Buffs (Royal East Kent Regiment), which existed as an infantry regiment of the British Army from 1881 to 1961.

Original composition
When the 3rd (The East Kent) Regiment of Foot became the Buffs (East Kent Regiment) in 1881 under the Cardwell-Childers reforms of the British Armed Forces, four pre-existent militia and volunteer battalions of Kent were integrated into the structure of the regiment. Volunteer battalions had been created in reaction to a perceived threat of invasion by France in the late 1850s. Organised as "rifle volunteer corps", they were independent of the British Army and composed primarily of the middle class. The only change to the regiment's structure during the period of 1881-1908 occurred in 1888, when the two militia battalions of the regiment amalgamated.

Reorganisation

The Territorial Force (later Territorial Army) was formed in 1908, which the volunteer battalions joined, while the militia battalions transferred to the "Special Reserve". All volunteer battalions were renumbered to create a single sequential order.

First World War

The Buffs fielded 15 battalions and lost over 6,000 officers and other ranks during the course of the war. The regiment's territorial components formed duplicate second and third line battalions. As an example, the three-line battalions of the 4th Buffs were numbered as the 1/4th, 2/4th, and 3/4th respectively. Many battalions of the regiment were formed as part of Secretary of State for War Lord Kitchener's appeal for an initial 100,000 men volunteers in 1914. They were referred to as the New Army or Kitchener's Army.  The Volunteer Training Corps were raised with overage or reserved occupation men early in the war, and were initially self-organised into many small corps, with a wide variety of names. Recognition of the corps by the authorities brought regulation and as the war continued the small corps were formed into battalion sized units of the county Volunteer Regiment. In 1918 these were linked to county regiments.

Inter-War
By 1920, all of the regiment's war-raised battalions had disbanded. The Special Reserve reverted to its militia designation in 1921, then to the Supplementary Reserve in 1924; however, its battalions were effectively placed in 'suspended animation'. As World War II approached, the Territorial Army was reorganised in the mid-1930s, many of its infantry battalions were converted to other roles, especially anti-aircraft.

Second World War
The Buff's expansion during the Second World War was modest compared to 1914–1918. National Defence Companies were combined to create a new "Home Defence" battalion, In addition to this, 12 of the 39 Kent battalions of the Home Guard were affiliated to the regiment, wearing its cap badge.

Post-World War II

In the immediate post-war period, the army was significantly reduced: nearly all infantry regiments had their first and second battalions amalgamated and the Supplementary Reserve disbanded.

Amalgamation
In 1956, the 5th Battalion was reformed, leading to the 4th/5th Battalion being redesignated as the 4th Battalion. The 1957 Defence White Paper stated that the Buffs was due to amalgamated with the Queen's Own Royal West Kent Regiment, to form the Queen's Own Buffs, The Royal Kent Regiment on the 1 March 1961.

References

Sources
 J.B.M. Frederick, Lineage Book of British Land Forces 1660–1978, Vol I, Wakefield: Microform Academic, 1984, .
 Brig E.A. James, British Regiments 1914–18, London: Samson Books, 1978/Uckfield: Naval & Military Press, 2001, .
 
 The Long, Long Trail

Buffs (Royal East Kent Regiment)
Buffs (Royal East Kent Regiment), List of battalions
Buffs (Royal East Kent Regiment)
Buffs (Royal East Kent Regiment)
Battalions